Carrettieri is a melody in the Sicilian language composed by Alfonso Gibilaro and included in No. 3 of the compendium entitled Quatro miniature Siciliane. It was published in London in April 1949 by Francis, Day & Hunter Ltd.  then recorded the following month for His Master's Voice by tenor Beniamino Gigli.

Carrettieri
Calatu è già lu suli intra lu mari
Si stancu vestia mia, iu puru tantu
Li roti chianu chianu fa girari
A casa tu mi porti ed iu ti cantu
Lu suli è naspressatu tuttu u jornu
Lu pruvulazzu quarnaravava 'ntornu
Scattare là 'a paglia e lu me pani
E avemu a cuminciari arré dumani
The cart driver
The sun has already set on the sea
You're tired, my beast, and so am I
You make the wheels turn slowly, slowly
You bring me home, and I sing to you
The sun is scorching all day long
The dust swirls all around
Hauling straw is how I earn my bread
And we have to start over again tomorrow

References 

1949 in music
Sicilian-language mass media
Music of Sicily
1949 songs